Antonina Leontievna Zubkova (12 October 1920 — 13 November 1950) was a captain and squadron navigator in the women's 125th Guards Dive Bomber Regiment during World War II who was awarded the title Hero of the Soviet Union.

Prewar life 
Zubkova was born on 12 October 1920 to a Russian family in the city of Semyon in the Ryazan district of the Russian SFSR. After completing her seventh grade of school in her home village in 1935 she moved to Korablino, where she studied until graduating from her tenth grade of school in 1938, after which she went on to enter the Faculty of Mechanics and Mathematics of Moscow State University, where she was considered one of the top students.

World War II 
During her fourth year of university, Zubkova had to pause her studies due to the German invasion of the Soviet Union. After initially working in the construction of defensive structures and taking part in air defense watch duty at night, she received word that Marina Raskova was recruiting women for military aviation roles. Raskova met with Zubkova and thought she would make a good navigator for bombers due to her mathematics skills, and was accepted into the women's aviation group in October 1941. She then underwent training at Engel's Military Aviation School, and was heavily moved by her first training flight, having since she had never been in an airplane before. After graduating from navigation training in February 1942 she was appointed as chief of communications of the 587th Bomber Regiment, which arrived at the warfront January 1943 and eventually awarded the guards designation, becoming the 125th Guards Dive Bomber Regiment. Several months after being made chief of communications Zubkova was reappointed to work as a flight navigator. After making her first twelve sorties from April to June 1943 she received her first combat award, the Order of the Red Star. During a mission with Nadezhda Fedutenko on 26 May 1943 their Pe-2 was hit with shrapnel over Krasnodar, seriously injuring her pilot Fedutenko in the back of her head, leaving Zubkova to bring the plane to airfield.

In 1944 Zubkova was promoted to the position of squadron navigator, and in mid-March 1945 she was nominated for the title Hero of the Soviet Union for having tallied 56 sorties, resulting in the destruction of three ammunition depots, three trains, twelve tanks, fifty vehicles, and five machine-gun points. In addition to assisting navigation and  bombing targets, Zubkova took high-quality photos showing the results of bombing for reports and reconnaissance of enemy troops; such photos were praised by her superior officers for providing useful information about the state forces on the ground and for the evidence of mission success. By the end of the war she totaled 68 sorties.

Later life 
After entering the reserve in September 1945 she returned to her studied at Moscow State University, completing her initial studies in 1948 before moving on to the graduate school of Research Institute of Mechanics. She married a navigator from another aviation regiment, Yevgeny Nedugov, and gave birth to their daughter Yelena in 1947. She committed suicide on 13 November 1950 and was buried in the Vagankovo Cemetery in Moscow.

Awards 
 Hero of the Soviet Union (18 August 1945)
 Order of Lenin (18 August 1945)
 Two Orders of the Red Banner (5 September 1943 and 10 July 1944)
 Order of the Red Star (18 June 1943)
 campaign medals

See also 

 List of female Heroes of the Soviet Union
 125th Guards Dive Bomber Regiment
 Petlyakov Pe-2

References

Bibliography
 
 

1920 births
1950 deaths
Heroes of the Soviet Union
Soviet World War II bomber pilots
Women air force personnel of the Soviet Union
Recipients of the Order of Lenin
Recipients of the Order of the Red Banner
1950 suicides
Suicides in the Soviet Union
Suicides in Moscow